MacKenzie Richard Bourg (born September 11, 1992;) is an American singer-songwriter originally from Lafayette, Louisiana. He was placed fourth in the fifteenth season of the reality show American Idol. Prior to appearing on American Idol, Bourg competed in the third season of The Voice.

Biography 
MacKenzie Bourg was born on September 11, 1992, the son of Rudy Bourg and Michelle Arceneaux. He attended St. Thomas More High School in Lafayette. He played basketball at school but had to quit the sport in his junior year after contracting a virus which triggered congestive heart failure, and had to be kept in an induced coma. After his recovery from his illness, he concentrated on music.

He was a contestant on the third season of The Voice where he was defaulted to CeeLo Green's team.

Later career 
In 2016, Bourg auditioned for American Idol at Atlanta, Georgia performing a medley of songs by the judges. He sang his original song "Roses" for his final solo performance to advance to the Showcase round. Bourg advanced to the top 24 after he performed "Can't Help Falling in Love". He was eliminated out of the top 4 on March 31.

"Lost & Found" was released in December 2017.

The Voice

Overview

Performances/results

American Idol

Overview
MacKenzie auditioned for the fifteenth season of American Idol in Atlanta, Georgia. He performed a medley of songs for the judges, and was given a ticket to Hollywood. During both the Showcase Round and Top 14, he sang his original song "Roses", which was loved by the judges and fans at home.

He performed a duet with Lauren Alaina during night two of top 24, singing "I Hope You Dance." During top 6, he performed a duet with fellow contestant Dalton Rapattoni, singing "I Want It That Way."

After being in the bottom 2 with La'Porsha Renae, Bourg was eliminated on March 31.

Performances/results

Post-Idol 
Bourg released his single "Roses" in association with Big Machine Records on April 7.

Discography

Singles

The Voice releases

American Idol releases

Filmography

References 

1992 births
American Idol participants
The Voice (franchise) contestants
Living people
Singers from Louisiana
People from Lafayette, Louisiana
21st-century American male singers
21st-century American singers